The Lamone is a river in the Tuscany and Emilia-Romagna regions of Italy. The source of the river is in the Appennino Tosco-Emiliano mountains in the province of Florence. The river flows northeast near Marradi before crossing the border into the province of Ravenna. It continues flowing northeast near Brisighella, Faenza, Russi and Bagnacavallo before curving eastward north of Ravenna and entering the Adriatic Sea near Marina Romea and Marina di Ravenna.

References

Rivers of the Province of Florence
Rivers of the Province of Ravenna
Rivers of Italy
Adriatic Italian coast basins